The Second All-Union Congress of Soviets was held in Moscow from January 26 to February 2, 1924. On January 27 and 28, meetings were not held in connection with the funeral of Vladimir Lenin. 2124 delegates took part in the congress, 1540 of them with a decisive vote.

Day order
Papers:
On the Constitution (Basic Law) of the Soviet Union;
The Perpetuation of the Memory of Vladimir Lenin;
On the Activities of the Soviet Government;
On the Budget of the Soviet Union;
On the Establishment of the Central Agricultural Bank.

Congress decisions

Elected at the congress
Second All-Union Central Executive Committee (bicameral: Soviet of the Union and Soviet of Nationalities)

Documents accepted
First Constitution of the Soviet Union
Decisions:
On the Publication of the Works of Lenin
On Renaming the City of Petrograd to the City of Leningrad
On the Establishment of the Day of Mourning
On the Construction of the Mausoleum of Lenin on Red Square in Moscow

The Second Congress formalized the basic legislation in which the Soviet Union was built upon when it approved the 1924 Constitution, the first of the Soviet Union.

References

External links

1924 in Moscow
Congress of Soviets of the Soviet Union
Economic history of the Soviet Union
January 1924 events
February 1924 events